Chicken is L.A. rock band Ednaswap's first and only EP. It was recorded after the band left Eastwest Records and was signed to Island Records, and came out a year before their full-length Island debut, Wacko Magneto.

Track listing

"Glow" (Anderson, Carla Azar, Paul Bushnell, Scott Cutler, Anne Preven) – 4:02
"Nothing is Broken" (Anderson, Azar, Bushnell, Cutler, Preven) – 3:02
"Torn" (Scott Cutler, Anne Preven, Phil Thornalley) – 4:01
"Therapy" (Anderson, Azar, Bushnell, Cutler, Preven) – 4:05
"Way Down" (Anderson, Azar, Bushnell, Cutler, Preven) – 3:31

Personnel 

Rusty Anderson – Guitar
Carla Azar – Drums
Paul Bushnell – Bass
Bryan Carlstrom – Engineer
Annette Cisneros – Assistant Engineer
Scott Cutler – Guitar
Ednaswap – Producer, Design, Cover Design
Derick Ion – Photography
Bryan Jerden – Assistant Engineer
Anna Kalinka – Design, Cover Design
Anne Preven – Vocals
Eddy Schreyer – Mastering

References 

1996 debut EPs
Ednaswap albums